Kadiatou Claudine Holm Keita, (born 6 September 2001) is a Swedish singer of Guinean and Ugandan descent. She grew up in Lidingö.

She was one of the finalists in Idol 2018 which is broadcast on TV4. She competed against Sebastian Walldén in Globen on 7 December and placed second.

Kadiatou participated in Melodifestivalen 2021 with her song "One Touch", but failed to qualify for the final after placing sixth in the first semi-final.

Singles

References 

Idol (Swedish TV series) participants
Living people
2001 births
Singers from Stockholm
21st-century Swedish singers
21st-century Swedish women singers
Swedish people of Ugandan descent
Swedish people of Guinean descent
Melodifestivalen contestants of 2021